Eric Wilson (5 January 1911 – 25 November 1946) was an Australian painter. He was born in Annandale, Sydney, in Australia.

Life and work
He won the New South Wales Travelling Art Scholarship in 1937. With this scholarship, Wilson relocated to England for two years. He studied under Henry Moore and Elmslie Owen. During his time in England, he also went to the Netherlands, Italy and Paris, France.His painting of Scott Street, Glasgow is a scene two hundred yards north of Glasgow School of Art. Glasgow School of Art stands on Scott Street, Glasgow but is behind the artist's viewpoint. He returned to Australia and began creating works in the cubist style. He was commissioned by Keith Murdoch, who had Wilson work at his home in Murrumbidgee Shire. He died of cancer in 1946.

His work is held in the collection of the Art Gallery of New South Wales and National Gallery of Victoria.

Notable awards
New South Wales Travelling Art Scholarship, 1937

References

External links
 Eric Wilson at the Art Gallery of New South Wales

1911 births
1946 deaths
20th-century Australian painters
20th-century Australian male artists
People from the Inner West (Sydney)
Australian male painters